Ashish Deo is a script writer and film director. He started his career with the television serial 'Chhoti si yeh duniya' under the banner 'Vishesh Films' – Mukesh Bhatt.
 
Ashish has worked, as a writer, with some of the most reputed brands of the television industry such as Ramesh Sippy, Ravi Rai, Cinevistas, Kushan Nandy Creations, Mad Films, UTV and more.

Some of his popular television serials include Do Lafzon ki Kahani & Chacha Chowdhary for channel Sahara One, Saturday Suspense for Zee TV, Kya Baat hai? for Star Plus, Suspense Hour & Thriller at Ten for Zee Tv, Crime Patrol Sony TV, etc.

He has written and directed documentaries and ad films. His theatre plays in Marathi have performed hundreds of shows and have been translated into Hindi and Gujrathi. He has also directed an English play.

His one-act plays have won more than 80 state level awards. He secured several awards for best writer, best director, best actor, best play, best lights etc.

Ashish R. Deo moved to film writing with his first movie, 88 Antop Hill, a critically acclaimed suspense thriller. Five of his movies in Hindi, English and Marathi films have already released.

His Marathi film, Vasudeo Balwant Phadke, received the best film award last year. He has written a movie, Darna Zaruri Hai, for one of the most reputed company of bollywood industry – K Sara Sara Ram Gopal Verma and has currently completed writing seven Hindi movies which are ready for shooting.

Awards 	: Personal ( Marathi Stage )

I.	Aayushya Asach Jagaayach Asata (One Act Play)

•	1st prize – best play 
•	1st prize – best writer
•	1st prize – best director
•	2nd prize – best Actor

II.	Shanta Jog state level one act play Competition 1996

•	1st prize – best play
•	1st prize – best writer
•	1st prize – best director
•	1st prize – best actor

III.	OM Sai state level one act play Competition 1996

•	2nd prize – best play
•	1st prize – best director
•	1st prize – best lights

IV.	N. Purav state level one act play Competition 1997

Ithe Maanus Jaagaa Aahe (One Act Play )
•	1st prize – best play
•	1st prize – best writer
•	1st prize – best director

V.	OM Sai state level one act play Competition 1997
•	1st prize – best play 
•	1st prize – best director

VI.	Palm Ekars state level one act play competition1997

Ghar Doghaancha (One Act Play)
•	1st prize – best play 
•	1st prize – best director

VII.	Naatya Darpan (State level One act play competition) 1999

•	Viewer's choice award in Savaai 2000
•	1st prize – best writer ( Pasaydaan Pune ) 2001

WORK EXPERIENCE

A.	Experience	: Feature Films.. released

1.	Feature Film	: [JETA] (Marathi) (Additional Dialogues)
Producer 	: [Ramesh Deo Productions] Released on 6 August 2010

2.	Feature Film	: [Vasudeo Balvant Phadke] (Marathi)
Producer 	: [Ramesh Deo Productions] Released on 7 Dec 7

3.	Feature Film	: [Darnaa Zaruri Hai..] (Released on 28 Apr 6)
Produced by 	: [Ram Gopal Varma].

4.	Feature Film	: [Vishvas] (Marathi) (Directed By : [Girish Mohite])
Produced by	: Oracle entertainment Pvt. Ltd.(released on 24 Mar 6)

5.	Feature Film	: [88 Antop Hill]
Produced by	: Sarvodaya Visuals(Released on 27 June 2003)

B.	Experience	: TV Serials..

1.	Name		: [Crime Patrol] ( Episodic real stories of crime)
Produced by	: Cine Vista (Released on Sony TV 2004–2006)

2.	Name		: [Chhoti si yeh duniya] ( Emotional & Comedy )
Produced by	: [Mr.Mukesh Bhatt]

3.	Name		: [Kya baat Hai?] (Slapstick Comedy)
Produced by	: [Mr. Ramesh Sippy] (Released on STAR PLUS) 1997–1998

4.	Name		: [Raajkahaani] (Historical Drama)	[DD1] – 1998–99

5.	Name		: [Mr. Gaayab] (Science Fiction) [ZEE TV] – 19 98–99

6.	Name		: [Do Lafzo ki Kahani] (Family Drama) [Sahara TV]-June 2001–02

7.	Name		: [Shree 420] ( Episodic) (Con Cases)
Produced by	: MAD Entertainment Ltd.
Directed by	: Anshuman Singh 	(Released on Zee TV) 2001

8.	Name		:[Saturday Suspense] & Suspense Hour

9.	Name		:Thriller at 10 ([ZEE TV])

10.	Name		: [The Locked Room] ( X zone ) [Zee Tv]. On 26 November 2000

C.	Experience	: [Tele Film]

1.	Name		: Chakravyuha (Director's cut) (Suspense Thriller)
Directed by	: Shahjehan	Released on Channel 9 16 December 2000

2.	Name		: Kisi Mod Par (Slot – Kambakht Ishq)
Directed by 	: Hari Nair	Released on Zee TV..  on 25 January 2003

D.	Experience	: Stage Shows & Events

1.	Name		: Zintag 98.. (Written and Directed a musical show with play back singers to raise fund for a church) May 1998

2.	Name		: Superstar Millennium 2001 ( New Year Show 31 December 2000) For[Zee TV] Many film based anchor shows.. for various channels like[zee], [Sahara], [Sony], [EL Tv], [Channel 9], [DD Metro],

3.	Name 		: Bollywood Musical Night, (G.S. Entertainment)(An Entertainment show with playback singers at Dubai on 3 October 2003)

4.	Name 		: Dil Ka Maamla hai..  Designed, Written and Directed An Entertaining Event with.. Magicians.. Musical Orchestra of all the doctors.. and an audio visual show.. "Direct Dil Se" (for a company named B BRAUN, for a conference of Cardiologists from all over India ) 2002 March.

5.	Name 	 	: ROSY BLUE SHOW.. Written and Directed an Event for Lintas Advertising.. Client Rosy Blue, at Hotel Taj on 28 Dec 6

E.	Experience	: Marathi Serial

1.	Name 		: Reshim gaathi Released on [ZEE ( Alpha )TV] 23 February 2000

F.	Experience	: TVC (English, Hindi, Marathi)

1.	Ad Agency	: Strategic Vision
2.	Campaign	: Winston Jeans
3.	Campaign	: Moniba Water Purifier
4.	Campaign	: Super Gas (Corporate film, van promotional film)

G.	Experience	: Documentary / Presentation Films

1.	Name		: Sangharsh Yatri (Written and Directed a documentary on Mr. Govindrao Adik.)
(President- [Maharashtra Pradesh Congress Committee])

2.	Name		: The Story of success (Written and Directed a presentation film for Yash Holidays)

H.	Experience	: Marathi Stage

Ø	One Act Plays

1.	Aayushya Asach Jagaayacha Asata
(Over all 27 Awards in state level competitions)
I
2.	the Maanus Jaaga Aahe
(Over all 22 Awards in state level competitions)

3.	Ghar Doghancha
(Over all 46 Awards in state level competitions)

Ø	Two Act Professional Plays

1.	Aayushya Asach Jagaayacha Asata (1997 jan)
2.	Eka Talyaat Hoti....  (2002 July.)
3.	Aamchi Jyeshth Kanya... 2002 aug. (Completed 150 shows successfully)

Ø	Hinglish (hind & English) Play.. Writing and Creative Direction.

1.	Just Muhobbat.. ( 25 July 2004)

References

External links
 

Living people
Indian male screenwriters
Year of birth missing (living people)
Indian television writers
Male television writers